Rasstrigin is a rural locality (a khutor) in Suvodskoye Rural Settlement, Dubovsky District, Volgograd Oblast, Russia. The population was 66 as of 2010. There is 1 street.

Geography 
The village is located in steppe, on the right bank of the Beryozovaya River, 50 km NNE from Dubovka.

References 

Rural localities in Dubovsky District, Volgograd Oblast